Union of Grodno may refer to
 Union of Grodno (1432) between Poland and Lithuania
 Union of Grodno (1566) between Lithuania and Livonia